Shanksville-Stonycreek High School, located near the small community of Shanksville, in central Somerset County is a small high school serving a census of 146 in grades 9-12. Located within five miles is the newly dedicated Flight 93 National Memorial in Pennsylvania's Laurel Highlands.

School History
The school was originally constructed in 1929 and was renovated and modified two times prior (1954 and 1988) to the recent renovation in 2000, when state-of-the-art science facilities, a gymnasium with locker rooms, art and music rooms, tech ed classrooms, and a wood shop, as well as ADA improvements were made, completing the $9.0 million project.

Vocational Education
Students in grades 10-12, who wish to pursue training in a specific career path or field may attend the Somerset County Technology Center in Somerset Township.

Athletics
Shanksville-Stonycreek participates in PIAA District V. Cooperative sports in Soccer and Football at Berlin-Brothersvalley and at Shade for Track and Field.

References

Public high schools in Pennsylvania
Schools in Somerset County, Pennsylvania
Educational institutions established in 1929
1929 establishments in Pennsylvania